Ram Feran Pandey is an Indian Politician from Bharatiya Janata Party and a Member of the Uttar Pradesh Legislative Assembly.  He is a member of 18th Uttar Pradesh Assembly and was also  Seventeenth Legislative Assembly of Uttar Pradesh from Shravasti Vidhansabha.

Positions held

References

External links 

UP Legislative Assembly

1965 births
Bharatiya Janata Party politicians from Uttar Pradesh
Living people
Uttar Pradesh MLAs 2017–2022
Uttar Pradesh MLAs 2022–2027